Westerville North High School is a public high school in Westerville, Ohio in Delaware County, Ohio.  It is one of three high schools in the Westerville City School District.  The school's current principal is Kurt Yancey.

Background
The high school has been open since 1975.  Westerville North's colors are cardinal and gold and its mascot is a representation of a classic Roman warrior.  Students follow a moral code known as The Warrior Way, which focuses on respect for one another, parents, school and community. There are many traditions that are part of the school including seniors painting a large boulder outside the school, and walking around the school emblem in the front lobby for good luck.

The high school is one of three in the Westerville school district.

In the media
Westerville North has occasionally received national press attention, usually for unusual events taking place at the school. An incident involving marijuana-laced Rice Krispies treats sold at a bake sale was mentioned on The Tonight Show with Jay Leno. Many news networks featured a story involving Taylor Killian, a student who oiled himself down, went streaking throughout the school, and was subsequently tased twice by Westerville police officer Doug Staysniak. The school was also mentioned in a March 2008 episode of The Daily Show with Jon Stewart, after Democratic presidential candidates appeared at rallies on the same day at Westerville North and Westerville Central.

Westerville North has also received local media attention for its service to the local food bank, WARM (Westerville Area Resource Ministry). The school regularly raises over $20,000 each year to support local families in need of food, clothing, and gifts for the holidays. It also was recognized as one of Fox 28's Cool Schools. Highlights for this recognition focused on the Hydroponics program in which WNHS raises plants and herbs to donate or sell to local businesses, the show choir called the Notables, and school spirit.

Ohio High School Athletic Association State championships

 Girls Track - 1977, 1979 - schools first OCC Championship
 Boys Tennis-Doubles 1985
 Boys Basketball – 1994
 Boys Track and Field – 1998 (tie)
 Boys Soccer – 1995,2003
 Girls Soccer – 1990,1992

Academic honors

Westerville North is listed #1205 on Newsweek's list of "America's Top High Schools" for 2010

As of 2017 Westerville North is listed as #1763 on US News High Schools

Notable alumni

Jeff Davidson, All Big Ten offensive lineman for Ohio State. Played in the NFL for the Denver Broncos and New Orleans Saints.
Josh Harris, BGSU standout and Retired NFL Quarterback
Bob Kennedy, Indiana University standout and two-time track-and-field Olympic athlete
Kevin Martin, basketball player
Shaun Stonerook, basketball player
Ryan Wilson, track and field olympian

External links
Westerville North High School

Notes and references

Westerville, Ohio
High schools in Delaware County, Ohio
Public high schools in Ohio